The 2015 World RX of Italy was the twelfth round of the second season of the FIA World Rallycross Championship. The event was held at the Franciacorta International Circuit in Franciacorta, Lombardy.

Heats

Semi-finals

World Championship

Semi-final 1

Semi-final 2

European Championship

Semi-final 1

Semi-final 2

Finals

World Championship

European Championship

Standings after the event

World Championship standings

European Championship standings

 Note: Only the top five positions are included for both sets of standings.

References

External links

|- style="text-align:center"
|width="35%"|Previous race:2015 World RX of Turkey
|width="30%"|FIA World Rallycross Championship2015 season
|width="35%"|Next race:2015 World RX of Argentina
|- style="text-align:center"
|width="35%"|Previous race:2014 World RX of Italy
|width="30%"|World RX of Italy
|width="35%"|Next race:None
|- style="text-align:center"

Italy
World RX